Gerson Guimarães Ferreira Júnior (born 7 January 1992), commonly known as Gerson,  is a Brazilian professional footballer who most recently played as a centre back for Polish club Górnik Łęczna.

Career
He started his professional career with Botafogo in 2010. In January 2011, he joined the youth team of Dutch giants PSV Eindhoven on loan. After a six-month stint with PSV youth, he signed a loan deal with Segunda División B side Atlético Madrid B in July. Gerson joined Austrian side Kapfenberg in 2012, being loaned first to Rapid Wien and then to Ferencváros. In January 2014, he was transferred to Petrolul Ploiești.

References

External links

1992 births
Living people
Footballers from São Paulo
Brazilian footballers
Botafogo de Futebol e Regatas players
PSV Eindhoven players
Atlético Madrid footballers
Kapfenberger SV players
SK Rapid Wien players
Ferencvárosi TC footballers
FC Petrolul Ploiești players
Lechia Gdańsk players
Górnik Łęczna players
Gangwon FC players
Centro Sportivo Alagoano players
Esporte Clube São Bento players
FK Liepāja players
Kagoshima United FC players
Austrian Football Bundesliga players
Nemzeti Bajnokság I players
Liga I players
Ekstraklasa players
K League 1 players
Brazilian expatriate footballers
Expatriate footballers in the Netherlands
Expatriate footballers in Spain
Expatriate footballers in Austria
Expatriate footballers in Hungary
Expatriate footballers in Romania
Expatriate footballers in Poland
Expatriate footballers in Latvia
Expatriate footballers in South Korea
Expatriate footballers in Japan
Brazilian expatriate sportspeople in the Netherlands
Brazilian expatriate sportspeople in Spain
Brazilian expatriate sportspeople in Austria
Brazilian expatriate sportspeople in Hungary
Brazilian expatriate sportspeople in Romania
Brazilian expatriate sportspeople in Poland
Brazilian expatriate sportspeople in Latvia
Brazilian expatriate sportspeople in South Korea
Brazilian expatriate sportspeople in Japan
Association football defenders